Donald MacDonald (1825–20 August 1901) was a Highland minister who helped form the Free Presbyterian Church of Scotland.
He was born at Langass in North Uist and died in Shieldaig, where he had been appointed Free Church of Scotland (1843–1900) minister in 1872. He supported the separation of Rev Donald MacFarlane, Raasay, from the Free Church  in May 1893 in protest at the church's Declaratory Act. With MacFarlane, he founded the first presbytery of the Free Presbyterian Church of Scotland in August of that year. Like him, he was supported by most of his own congregation but evicted from church and manse by ministers and elders in their respective presbyteries who had stayed within the Free Church. MacDonald and MacFarlane saw the body they founded together grow substantially. His preaching was highly valued and sometimes compared to that of the Rev Archibald Cook of Daviot, Highland Inverness-shire.

Works and Publications
 Creation and the Fall; A Defence and Exposition of the First Three Chapters of Genesis (1856)

References

1825 births
1901 deaths
19th-century Ministers of the Free Church of Scotland
Ministers of the Free Presbyterian Church of Scotland